Love is the second album by Masaki Suda. It was released on July 10, 2019. It debuted at number three on the Oricon Albums Chart.

Track listing

Charts

Album

Singles
"Machigai Sagashi"

Awards

References

2019 albums
Japanese-language albums
Masaki Suda albums